The Comfort Classic was a golf tournament on the Champions Tour from 1988 to 2000. It was played in Indianapolis, Indiana at the Broadmoor Country Club (1988–1993) and at the Brickyard Crossing Golf Club (1994–2000). Title sponsorship was from Comfort Inn.

The purse for the 2000 tournament was US$1,250,000, with $187,500 going to the winner. The tournament was founded in 1988 as the GTE North Classic.

In 2000, the Indianapolis Motor Speedway started hosting the United States Grand Prix, which created an unfavorable tight scheduling conflict with the golf tournament. In addition, competitors had begun voicing complaints about the unchallenging nature of how the course was being set up for tournament play. In December 2000, Comfort Inns ended their sponsorship, and the event was not held again.

Winners

Comfort Classic at the Brickyard
2000 Gil Morgan
1999 Gil Morgan
1998 Hugh Baiocchi
1997 David Graham

Brickyard Crossing Championship Produced by the Brickyard Foundation
1996 Jimmy Powell

Brickyard Crossing Championship
1995 Simon Hobday

Brickyard Crossing Championship presented by GTE
1994 Isao Aoki

GTE North Classic
1993 Bob Murphy
1992 Raymond Floyd
1991 George Archer
1990 Mike Hill
1989 Gary Player
1988 Gary Player

Source:

References

Former PGA Tour Champions events
Golf in Indiana
Sports competitions in Indianapolis
Recurring sporting events established in 1988
Recurring sporting events disestablished in 2000
1988 establishments in Indiana
2000 disestablishments in Indiana